Asura temperata is a moth of the family Erebidae. It is found in Gabon.

References

Endemic fauna of Gabon
temperata
Fauna of Gabon
Moths of Africa
Moths described in 1893